Kelly James Dullanty (born July 4, 1977) is a retired American mixed martial artist who is probably best known for competing in the Ultimate Fighting Championship. Dullanty competed in both Featherweight and Lightweight divisions.


Mixed martial arts record

|-
| Loss
| align=center| 4–2
| Lance Wipf
| KO (punch)
| PureCombat - Bring the Pain
| 
| align=center| 1
| align=center| 0:09
| California, United States
| 
|-
| Loss
| align=center| 4–1
| Matt Serra
| Submission (triangle choke)
| UFC 36
| 
| align=center| 1
| align=center| 2:58
| Nevada, United States
| 
|-
| Win
| align=center| 4–0
| Rudy Vallederas
| TKO (corner stoppage)
| rowspan=2| IFC WC 13 - Warriors Challenge 13
| rowspan=2| 
| align=center| 1
| align=center| N/A
| rowspan=2| California, United States
| Won the IFC Warriors Challenge Lightweight tournament.
|-
| Win
| align=center| 3–0
| Nuri Shakir
| Decision (unanimous)
| 3
| align=center| 5:00
| IFC Warriors Challenge Lightweight tournament semifinal.
|-
| Win
| align=center| 2–0
| Duane Ludwig
| Decision (unanimous)
| KOTC 6 - Road Warriors
| 
| align=center| 3
| align=center| 5:00
| Michigan, United States
| 
|-
| Win
| align=center| 1–0
| Shad Smith
| TKO (strikes)
| KOTC 3 - Knockout Nightmare
| 
| align=center| 1
| align=center| 1:58
| California, United States
|

References

External links
 
 

American male mixed martial artists
Mixed martial artists from California
Lightweight mixed martial artists
Living people
1977 births
Ultimate Fighting Championship male fighters